State Road 656 (SR 656), also known as 17th Street, is a  state road in Indian River County, extending from U.S. Route 1 (US 1) to SR A1A mostly inside the city limits of Vero Beach.  It is the southernmost of two crossings in Vero Beach between the mainland and the barrier island, with the other being at State Road 60  to the north.

Route description
State Road 656 begins at US 1 at the intersection of 17th Street in central Vero Beach, with SR 656 heading east on 17th Street.  It passes through a commercial, then residential area before intersecting with County Road 603. The road crosses the Intracoastal Waterway to Dark Point on the barrier island, and ends at State Road A1A.

West of U.S. Route 1
The road becomes a city street west of US 1. It is longer than SR 656 and is called 16th Street. Immediately west of the Florida East Coast Railway is County Road 605. The road is now only 2 lanes wide like SR 510. It becomes a residential street beyond this point. Next, it passes another intersection of former State Road 607. This road provides access to Vero Beach Municipal Airport. Then, it intersects with County Road 611, this road provides access to the farmlands of southern Indian River County and northern St. Lucie County. One block west of 56th Court is Kings Highway, the western terminus of 16th Street.

Major intersections

References

External links

656
656
656